Aurivillia is a genus of moths in the family Lasiocampidae described by Tutt in 1902.

References

Lasiocampidae
Moth genera